Youcef Chorfa (born 21 December 1954) is the Algerian Minister of Labor, Employment and Social Security. He was appointed as minister on 11 November 2021.

References

External links 

 Ministry of Labor, Employment and Social Security

Living people
21st-century Algerian politicians
Algerian politicians
Government ministers of Algeria

1954 births